Haliplus camposi is a species of Haliplidae in the genus Haliplus. It was discovered in 1948.

References

Haliplidae
Beetles described in 1948